Susie Jones may refer to:

 Susie Jones (Musical Artist). Songwriter, performer and musical artist. Jones has released 3 albums as a solo artist including 'Not So Far Apart' (2020), 'Shake Away The Devil' (2015), and Beggar's Trail (2008) and a number of EPs and collaborative projects. Jones has collaborated with artists across the UK and written for Preston's world famous Preston Guild (2012) working alongside Lemn Sissay and MoreMusic. Susie Jones has toured extensively and has played with artists such as Eric Taylor, Chris Wood, Joe Pug, Lucy Ward and Bob Fox amongst others. An experienced performer Jones has played at festivals around the UK including the main stage of Green Meadows Festival, Head for the Hills Festival (Ramsbottom), Bakewell Folk Festival and has had radio play and performances on stations such as Radio Lancashire and BBC Introducing in Lancashire. Susie Jones is also a founding member of the experimental music collective The Dissonance Collective [TDC]. Music available on Spotify and Bandcamp. 

Susie Jones, sister of Indiana Jones
Susie Jones, presenter on WCCO (AM)
Susie Jones (filmmaker), see AACTA Award for Best Documentary Under One Hour

See also
Susannah Jones (disambiguation)
Sue Jones (disambiguation)